Darshan Thoogudeepa (born 16 February 1977) known mononymously as Darshan is an Indian actor, producer, and distributor who works predominantly in Kannada films. One of the leading contemporary actors of Kannada cinema, Darshan established the production house Thoogudeepa Productions in 2006. Its first production was Jothe Jotheyali, with Darshan in a special appearance. His performances in Anatharu (2007) and Krantiveera Sangolli Rayanna (2012) won him praise from critics; his performance in the latter as the 19th-century warrior Sangolli Rayanna won him the Karnataka State Film Award for Best Actor.

He began his acting career in soap operas and small films in the mid-1990s. His first film in a lead role was in the 2002 film Majestic. Darshan starred in commercially successful films such as Kariya (2003), Namma Preethiya Ramu (2003), Kalasipalya (2005), Gaja (2008), Navagraha (2008),Saarathi (2011), Bulbul (2013) Yajamana (2019) and Roberrt (2021), .

Early life
Darshan was born to actor Thoogudeepa Srinivas and Meena on 16 February 1977 in Ponnampet, Kodagu district, in the Indian state of Karnataka. He was given the name Hemanth Kumar at birth. Thoogudeepa is a 1966 Kannada film in which Srinivas acted and gained fame, following which the sobriquet stuck to his name. A popular actor during his time, he was reluctant towards Darshan following his path of film acting. Against his wishes, Darshan got himself enrolled in Ninasam, a theatre training institute, in Shimoga, prior to his father's death in 1995.

Darshan has a sister, Divya, and a younger brother, Dinakar, a filmmaker, running the production house, Thoogudeepa Productions. As a child, Darshan studied his primary and secondary education at Mysuru.

Acting career

Early career
After graduating from Ninasam, Darshan worked as a projectionist before becoming an assistant cameraman to veteran cinematographer B. C. Gowrishankar. His first acting role came in S. Narayan's television soap. Narayan then offered him a supporting role in his 1997 film Mahabharatha. Darshan subsequently featured in films such as Devara Maga (2000), Ellara Mane Dosenoo (2000), Bhoothayyana Makkalu (2000) and Mr. Harishchandra (2001), mostly in insignificant and supporting, often bit roles. This period also saw him play minor roles in other television soaps.

2001–2010
Darshan's major break in films came with Majestic, directed by P. N. Satya and released in 2001, in which he played the role of Daasa, an innocent youth-turned-underworld don. He then appeared in films such as Kitti, Ninagoskara, Neenandre Ishta and Daasa, produced by Ramesh Yadav. He starred in Prem's directorial debut, the 2003 action film  Kariya. He played a budding musician in Laali Haadu, a journalist in Lankesh Patrike and a blind poor man in Namma Preethiya Ramu.

In 2004, he starred in Kalasipalya, directed by Om Prakash Rao and in P. N. Satya's Daasa. In 2005, he acted in three more films Annavru, Shashtri and Ayya.

He starred again in Anaji Nagaraj's Swamy (2005), Suntaragaali (2006), Dattha (2006), Bhoopathi (2007), Snehana Preethina (2007) and Anatharu (2008), where he starred with Upendra.

In 2008, Gaja  helped him to establish a niche as a well built, rustic yet "posh" young man. Further movies include Indra (2008), Arjun (2008), Navagraha (2008), Yodha (2009), Abhay (2009).

In 2010, he acted as cop disguised as a rogue in Porki, which was a remake of the 2009 Telugu film Pokiri. His next movie was Shourya (2010). Then came Boss (2011) and Prince (2011).

2010–present
Darshan's next releases were Boss (2011) and Prince (2011). Next came the action drama Saarathi. His 2012 release was Chingari. Next, he played a role in the historical movie Krantiveera Sangolli Rayanna and got his maiden Karnataka State Film Awards and Filmfare Award for best actor. In 2013, he had two releases, Bulbul and Brindavana.

His 2014 film Ambareesha received mixed responses, though it was commercially successful. In Mr. Airavata, he played the role of a police officer. The Hindu wrote: "He sizzles on the screen in his tailor-made avatar as Mr. Airavata". In Viraat, his first release of 2016, he played a businessman wanting to provide a solution to the issue of irregular power supply by taking up a thermal power project. The Indian Express, in its review, wrote that despite the loopholes, Darshan "cements them". The reviewer added: "He is seen in his signature style of action, dialogue delivery and mannerism. This time the actor breezes through some dance steps". Darshan's next film Jaggu Dada saw him play a gangster, and received largely negative reviews from critics.  Darshan's next film was Chakravarthy in 2017 based on Bangalore Underworld's true story, which gave a mixed response from the audience, but got recognition for the new look. In later 2017, his next movie Tarak was released. On 1 March 2019, his 51st  movie Yajamana was released, becoming Darshan's biggest box office opener. Following the success of Yajamana, the big-budget Indian mythological movie Kurukshetra was released on 9 August 2019. Kurukshetra was well received by critics. In the same year, on 12 December 2019, Darshan released another film, Odeya. In June 2019, filming began on another Darshan film, Roberrt, which is directed by Tharun Kishore Sudhir and released on 2021.

Personal life
Darshan married his relative Vijayalakshmi, who was then a student in Chemical engineering, in 2003 at Dharmasthala Temple. They have a son, Vineesh. Darshan runs his own mini zoo in the far east of Mysuru, near Malavalli. Darshan's other passions are cars and bikes.

Controversies
Darshan was involved in a controversy in September 2011, when his wife complained to police, accusing him of domestic violence. He was subsequently arrested and spent 14 days in judicial custody at Parappana Agrahara. However, the marital discord was later settled out of court. He issued a public apology to his fans for the controversy. Though this was expected to dent his image, his immediate release Saarathi (2011) performed well at the box office. In 2016, his wife approached Bengaluru police to complain for Darshan's 'objectionable behaviour'. In 2021, Darshan was accused of assaulting a waiter at a Mysuru hotel. It was further alleged that the had police covered up the incident and the waiter was given Rs 50,000 as settlement. Bharat, a Kannada film producer lodged a police complaint against Darshan in 2022 for threatening him with dire consequences.

In Jan 2023, Forest Department personnel raided the farmhouse of actor Darshan near T. Narsipur and seized four Bar-headed geese on the grounds that he was possessing them in violation of the law.

Filmography

Production and distribution

In 2006, after much success in his career, he ventured into film production also. He established his own production house Thoogudeepa productions and its first film was Jothe Jotheyali, starring Prem, Ramya and had Darshan in a special appearance. The film was a commercial hit running 150 days in theatres.
In 2013, his family established a distribution company called Thoogudeepa Distributors. Bulbul (2013), produced under the home banner became the first movie to be distributed. Its other notable projects include distribution of Brindavana (2013), Prakash Raj's Oggarane (2014), the Sharan starrer Jai Lalitha (2014), the Sriimurali starrer Ugramm and the V. Ravichandran starrer Paramashiva (2014).

Awards and nominations

References

External links

 

1977 births
Living people
Indian male film actors
Male actors in Kannada cinema
Kannada film producers
Film producers from Karnataka
21st-century Indian male actors
Male actors from Karnataka
People from Kodagu district